Division de Honor de Béisbol is the highest level of baseball in Spain. The league is overseen by the Real Federación Española de Béisbol y Sófbol (RFEBS). It is played principally on weekends. The teams play against each other twice, once at home and once away, in two games during the same day. The champion plays in the European Cup. The official ball of the league is the Rawlings OLB.

Competition format
Ten teams plays in a double-leg round-robin tournament. In each round, teams play two games in the same weekend against the other teams. In the second of each pair of games, the pitcher must be eligible for the Spain national baseball team.

Since 2012, after the regular season, the two first qualified team play the Finals in a best-of-five playoffs format. The last qualified is relegated to Primera División A, composed in 2012 by only six teams.

In other way, the first four qualified teams, will play for the Copa del Rey de Béisbol of the next season.

2020 season teams

Champions by season

Campeonato de España

División de Honor

Titles by club

See also
Baseball awards#Spain

References

External links
official site

 
Professional sports leagues in Spain
Baseball in Spain
Baseball leagues in Europe
1986 establishments in Spain
Sports leagues established in 1986